The following is a timeline of the history of the city of Oslo, Norway.

Prior to 1537

 1000 - St. Clement's Church built (approximate date).
 1050
 Oslo founded by Harald Hardrada (approximate date), according to Snorre's saga.
 Mariakirken built (approximate date).
 1070 - Catholic diocese of Oslo established (approximate date).
 1080 (approximate) Old Aker Church erected (still existing)
 1153 - Oslo Cathedral School established.
 1240 - Battle in Oslo 1240
 1290s - Akershus Fortress construction begins (approximate date).
 1299 - Norwegian capital relocated to Oslo from Bergen.
 1308 - Akershus fortress withstands attack by Eric, Duke of Södermanland
 1314 - Haakon V of Norway declared that the provost of St Mary's church should be chancellor of Norway for ever (was abolished in 1679).
 1349 - Black Death plague.
 1352 - St. Hallvard's Cathedral and the other Sogne Churches are burned to the ground in a major fire.

After 1537
 1537 - Reformation, Norway became a client kingdom under the Danish crown, most of the  government administration moved to Copenhagen
 1567 - city destroyed during Nordic Seven Years' War
 1624 - ; settlement relocated to newly founded "Christiania," "Oslo" remained the name of a village outside the city
 1639 -  built.
 1641 -  (town hall) built.
 1643 - Printing press in operation.
 1654 - Vaterland Bridge built.
 1686 - Fire ruins ¼ of the city.
 1697 - Domkirken (church) built.
 1716 - City occupied by forces of Charles XII of Sweden.
 1769 - first census held and recorded 7469 inhabitants
 1771 - The first public theatre is inaugurated. 
 1780 - Deichman Library founded.
 The Det Dramatiske Selskab is founded.

19th century

 1811 - Royal Frederick University and Selskabet for Oslo Byes Vel (civic group) founded.
 1814 
 Christiania became capital in the new state of Norway
 University Botanical Garden (Oslo) established.
 1815 Supreme Court of Norway established
 1819
 Morgenbladet (newspaper) begins publication.
 Oslo Exchange established. 
  (park) opens.
 1827 - Nybrua (bridge) built. 
 The Strömberg Theatre is inaugurated. 
 1829
 May: Battle of the Square.
 J.W. Cappelens Forlag (publisher) in business.
 1836 - National Gallery built.
 1837
 Christiania Theatre built.
 Andreas Tofte becomes mayor.
 1838 - Christiania becomes a municipality.
 1841 - Akers Mekaniske Verksted in business.
 1844 - Toftes Gave (orphanage) established.
 1848 - Christiania Bank established.
 1849 - Royal Palace inaugurated.
 1851
"Cellular prison" begins operating.
 Oslo host a nordic student meeting. 
 1852
Christiania Norwegian Theatre opens.
 Oslo host a nordic student meeting.
 1854 - Eidsvoll-Christiania railroad, the "Main Line", begins operating.
 1855 - Population: 31,715 
 1857 - Den norske Creditbank headquartered in city.
 1858 - 14 April: 1858 Christiania fire.
 1860 - Aftenposten newspaper begins publication.
 1863 - Murder of Knut Grøte occurs.
 1866
 District Court established.
 Storting building (for parliament) constructed.
 1868 - Norwegian Trekking Association headquartered in city.
 1869 - Oslo host a nordic student meeting.
 1872
 Railway Drammen Line begins operating.
 West Station built.
  (bookshop) in business.
 1875
 Horse-drawn tram begins operating.
 Commerce School established.
 1876 -  founded.
 1878 - City expanded. Frogner, Majorstuen, Torshov, Kampen and Vålerenga are populated and rebuilt.
 1879 -Husebyrennet ski race held first time
 1881 - May: Wergeland monument unveiled in Eidsvolls plass.
 1885
 26 February: 1885 speed skating race at Frognerkilen takes place.
  founded.
 1892 - Holmenkollbakken (ski jump) built, Husebyrennet became Holmenkollen Ski Festival.
 1894 - Electric tram begins operating.
 1897 - Centralteatret opens.
 1898 - Tram Holmenkollen Line begins operating.
 1899 - Nationaltheateret (theatre) built.
 1900 - Postage meter (machine) introduced.

20th century

 1901 - Nobel Peace Prize ceremony begins.
 1904 - Norwegian Nobel Institute established.
 1905 - Haakon VII became first king of independent Norway
 1907 - Norwegian School of Theology established.
 1908 -  established.
 1910 - Population: 241,834.
 1912 - Kjeller Airport begins operating.
 1913 - Det Norske Teatret opened
 1914 - 1914 Jubilee Exhibition held.
 1916 - City Parks Department established.
 1920 - Synagogue built.
 1925 - City renamed "Oslo," the "Oslo" suburb renamed "Old Town" (Gamlebyen)
 1926 - Ankerbrua (bridge) rebuilt.
 1928
 Underground Oslo Metro begins operating.
  (bridge) built.
 1929
 Det Nye Teater opens.
 Eldorado Cinema (Oslo) in business.
 1932 - Oslo breakfast introduced in schools.
 1934
 Railway Sognsvann Line begins operating.
  (cinema) opens.
 1940 - 9 April: German occupation begins, King and cabinet escaped
 1941
 September: Milk strike occurs.
 Bredtvet concentration camp in operation.
 1942
 25 September: Oslo Mosquito raid by British forces.
 26 November: Norwegian Jews deported to Auschwitz from Oslo harbour
 1943 - 19 December: 1943 Filipstad explosion.
 1944 -  (sculpture) unveiled in Frogner Park.
 1945
 8 May German capitulation
 7 June King Haakon returned to Oslo and Allied occupation ended
 1946
 Armed Forces Museum (Norway) established.
 Population: 417,238.
 1948 - Aker becomes part of city.
 1950 - Oslo City Hall completed after 19 years construction.
 1952 - February: 1952 Winter Olympics held in Oslo.
 1954 -  (ski race) begins.
 1959
 Peace Research Institute Oslo founded.
  built.
 1963
 Club 7 active.
 Munch Museum opens.
 1972 -  built.
 1973 - Oslo Airport location controversy.
 1977 - Oslo Concert Hall opens.
 1980
 Norwegian Institute for Defence Studies established.
 Oslo Central Station, Nationaltheatret Station, and Oslo Tunnel open.
 1982 - Blitz (movement) begins.
 1990 
Oslo Spektrum (arena) opens.
Festningstunnelen opened
 1992
  (city archives) established.
 Ann-Marit Sæbønes becomes mayor.
 1993
 Israeli-Palestinian peace negotiations ("Oslo Accords") take place in Oslo.
 Islamic Council Norway headquartered in city.
 1994
 Oslo Courthouse built.
 Stenersen Museum opens.
 1995
  (bridge) built.
 Per Ditlev-Simonsen becomes mayor.
 1998
 Rikshospitalet (hospital) opens.
 Railway Gardermoen Line begins operating.
 2000 - City celebrates thousand-year jubilee.

21st century
 2001 - January: Demonstration following Hermansen murder.
 2002
 June: World Bank Oslo 2002 Protests.
 Population: 516,467 city; 783,829 metro.
 2003
 Oslo Bysykkel (bikeshare) begins operating.
 2004
 22 August: Robbery takes place at the Munch Museum.
  (mosque) established.
 2006 - Central Jamaat-e Ahl-e Sunnat (mosque) opens.
 2007 - Fabian Stang becomes mayor.
 2008 - Oslo Opera House opens.
 2009 - Stian Berger Røsland becomes governing mayor.
 2011
 FIS Nordic World Ski Championships 2011
 22 July: 2011 Norway attacks, consisting of a bombing in Regjeringskvartalet, and a massacre on the nearby Utøya island, causing 77 deaths combined (67 from the massacre, 7 from the bombing, and 2 indirectly).
  (bridge) and  built.
 2012 - 16 April: Breivik trial begins.
 2014
 March: Bid for the 2022 Winter Olympics submitted.
 Future Library project organized.
 Population: 647,676 city; 942,084 metro.
 2015
 September:  held.
 22 July Information Center opens.
 2018
 December: The city's urban area passed one million people for the first time.
 2022
 June: A terrorist mass shooting occurs in Oslo, killing two and injuring 21.

See also
 Oslo history with brief timeline of major events
 Timeline of transport in Oslo
 Other names of Oslo
 Timelines of other cities in Norway: Bergen
 List of years in Norway

References

This article incorporates information from the Norwegian Wikipedia.

Bibliography

Published in the 19th century

 
 

 Hunger. Knut Hamsun (1890). The ultimate book set in Oslo, "this wondrous city that no one leaves before it has made its marks upon him".
 

Published in the 20th century

 
 

 The Big Foxhunt. Ingvar Ambjørnsen (1983). Set in the late 1970s, telling the story of a young hash dealer.
 Beatles. Lars Saabye Christensen (1984). About growing up in the 1960s.
 Shyness and Dignity. Dag Solstad (1994).

Published in the 21st century

External links

 Map of Oslo, 1981
 Europeana. Items related to Oslo, various dates
 Digital Public Library of America. Items related to Oslo, various dates.

 
Oslo
Oslo
Years in Norway
Oslo